Stare Slemene is a settlement in the Municipality of Slovenske Konjice in eastern Slovenia. The area is part of the traditional region of Styria. The municipality is now included in the Savinja Statistical Region.

The settlement is dispersed in the hills around the 12th-century Žiče Charterhouse on the southern slopes of the Mount Konjice hills.

References

External links
Stare Slemene at Geopedia

Populated places in the Municipality of Slovenske Konjice